Tjørnuvík is the northernmost village on Streymoy in Sunda Municipality, Faroe Islands. As of the 2006 census, the population has a total of 71 people.

The town uses the Stakkur sea stack for sheep grazing, accessed by cable car. The Risin og Kellingin sea stacks are visible across the Sundini strait.

A 5 km single-lane dead-end road (route 594) from Haldórsvík is the only way to reach Tjørnuvík. Tourists clogged the road in summer, before a traffic control system improved conditions in 2022.

Gallery

See also 
Towns of the Faroe Islands

References

External links
Personal Danish site with photographs of Tjørnuvík

Populated places in the Faroe Islands
Black sand beaches